Dome Glacier is in Snoqualmie National Forest in the U.S. state of Washington and is on the north slopes of Dome Peak. An arête separates the glacier from Dana Glacier to the northwest and Chickamin Glacier to the east.

See also
List of glaciers in the United States

References

Glaciers of the North Cascades
Glaciers of Skagit County, Washington
Glaciers of Washington (state)